Pomeroy is a neighborhood of Kansas City, Kansas, in the United States.

Pomeroy was platted as a village in 1871.

References

Neighborhoods in Kansas City, Kansas